Boldon School is a coeducational secondary school located in Boldon Colliery, South Tyneside, England.

A community school administered by South Tyneside Metropolitan Borough Council, it has a specialism in sports. The school relocated to a new £17.5 million building in 2006.

Boldon School offers GCSEs, BTECs and Cambridge Nationals as programmes of study for pupils. The school also operates a vocational sixth form which offers NVQs and further BTECs.

Notable former pupils
Simon Brown, professional cricketer
Shaun Reay, footballer
Steve Robson, music producer
Wes Saunders, footballer

References

External links
Boldon School official website

Secondary schools in the Metropolitan Borough of South Tyneside
Community schools in the Metropolitan Borough of South Tyneside